Blocher is an unincorporated community in Johnson Township, Scott County, in the U.S. state of Indiana.

History
Blocher was founded in 1860 by Daniel Blocher. An old variant name of the community was called Holman Station.

A post office was established under the name Holman Station in 1870, was renamed Blocher in 1888, and operated until it was discontinued in 1965.

Geography

References

Unincorporated communities in Scott County, Indiana
Unincorporated communities in Indiana